But Beautiful: The Best of Shirley Horn is a greatest hits album by American jazz singer and pianist Shirley Horn, released on October 11, 2005, by Verve Records. The album, among other things, also contains three live recordings made at the Au Bar in New York in January 2005.

Track listing

Charts

References

External links
 

2005 greatest hits albums
Shirley Horn albums
Verve Records compilation albums